English Frankton, formerly known simply as Frankton, is a small village in Shropshire, England. It lies between the villages of Cockshutt and Loppington, in the civil parish of Cockshutt, and south-east of Ellesmere. 

The name Frankton probably originated as "Francas's field". It was recorded in Domesday as Franchetone, when it was held by Rainald the Sheriff from Earl Roger. Domesday also noted that the manor contained one carruca, along with three villeins and two bordarii.

See also
Welsh Frankton
Lower Frankton

References

External links

Villages in Shropshire